Birgitta Lindqvist, later Vickström (24 July 1942 – 24 February 2010) was a Swedish cross-country skier. She competed in three events at the 1972 Winter Olympics.

Cross-country skiing results

Olympic Games

References

External links
 

1942 births
2010 deaths
Swedish female cross-country skiers
Olympic cross-country skiers of Sweden
Cross-country skiers at the 1972 Winter Olympics
People from Ragunda Municipality
20th-century Swedish women